Christopher Karl Mellon (born October 2, 1957), is a private equity investor, former Deputy Assistant Secretary of Defense for Intelligence in the Clinton and George W. Bush administrations and later for Security and Information Operations. He formerly served as the Staff Director of the United States Senate Select Committee on Intelligence. He is a member of the influential Mellon family out of the State of Pennsylvania.

Biography
Christopher Mellon was born to the Mellon family. He is the son of Karl Negley Mellon and Anne Stokes Bright, and the great-grandson of Gulf Oil co-founder William Larimer Mellon. His great-great-grandfather, Thomas Mellon, founded Mellon Bank of Pittsburgh. He received a B.A. in economics from Colby College in 1980 and a master's degree from Yale University in international relations, with a concentration in finance and management, in 1984.

Mellon served for 12 years in a variety of positions on Capitol Hill, including nearly 10 years as a professional staff member as a Staff Director of the Senate Select Committee on Intelligence. Mellon went to the Pentagon as a member of William Cohen's transition team on January 2, 1997. Following the transition, Mellon was appointed as the Coordinator for Advanced Concepts and Program Integration, Office of the Under Secretary of Defense for Policy, concentrating on encryption and information assurance issues. From November 1997 to June 1998, he served as the Special Assistant to the Secretary of Defense for Intelligence Policy, providing advice on a range of intelligence issues. From June 1998 through November 1999, Mellon served as the Deputy Assistant Secretary of Defense for Security and Information Operations. He was the Deputy Assistant Secretary of Defense for Intelligence from November 1999 until December 2002. In that capacity, he was responsible for policy and programmatic oversight of information assurance, critical infrastructure protection, security, counterintelligence, and information operations strategy and integration.   Before entering the private sector, Mellon returned to Capitol Hill, where he served as the Minority Staff Director of the Senate Intelligence Committee for Senator John D. Rockefeller, IV from 2002 to 2004.

Mellon was a lobbyist through an LLC named Mellon Strategic Consulting LLC from 2005 through 2009.

UFO/UAP work 

In a 2016 interview with Leslie Kean published on the now-closed HuffPost Contributor Forum, Mellon stated: I highly doubt DoD or any other government agency is concealing UFO information. I participated in a comprehensive review of DoD's black programs and spent over a decade conducting oversight of the national foreign intelligence program, an almost totally separate world of secrets. I visited Area 51 and other military, intelligence and research facilities. During all those years, I never detected the faintest hint of government interest or involvement in UFOs. ... While a few new, previously overlooked documents might turn up (the bureaucracy is never perfect), I do not believe they would resolve the UFO issue or provide significant new insights. I can think of one lengthy UFO report that is classified only due to concerns over sources and methods. In fact, it identified a convincing conventional explanation for the pilot sightings in this particular case. There are lots of classified documents related to activities at Area 51, where high security is needed. But this is all legitimate stuff the American people would support. They have nothing to do with UFOs, to the best of my knowledge.However, in a March 2022 opinion piece published by "The Hill" Mellon stated "I am approaching the UAP topic as a member of two serious groups of scientific researchers, the Galileo Project and the Scientific Coalition for UAP Studies (SCU). Both of these UAP research organizations have gathered able groups of scientists who are seeking to advance our collective understanding of UAP anomalies. Those efforts now appear to be hindered by new guidance that moves the classification yardsticks merely because some U.S. government officials dislike oversight and are uncomfortable sharing information."  Mellon continued, "since DOD isn’t claiming retroactively that the “Gimbal,” “Go Fast” or “FLIR1” videos themselves are or ever should have been classified, or that their release has damaged national security, by what authority are they now claiming the need or right to classify the same sorts of information going forward?"  Mellon worked with Leslie Kean in a UFO organization and is a shareholder and former advisor for the Blink 182 punk rocker Tom DeLonge's To The Stars Academy of Arts & Sciences. According to the company’s website, Mellon's title was "national security affairs advisor". Mellon assisted in production and works with former Pentagon Director of AATIP, Luis Elizondo as a cast member for the cable television network History that distributes the shows series Unidentified: Inside America's UFO Investigation.

Mellon was featured in the 2020 UFO documentary The Phenomenon, which was directed by longtime UFO enthusiast James Fox. In the documentary Mellon stated that he was the source who provided the three Pentagon UFO videos which made the "lavish front-page Sunday spread" of the New York Times on December 17, 2017: "Glowing Auras and ‘Black Money’: The Pentagon’s Mysterious UFO Program". In the documentary, Mellon claims he met with an individual he does identify in the parking lot of the Pentagon and was handed a package containing three videos recorded by U. S. Navy pilots between 2004 and 2015.

Mellon was featured on episode #1645 of the Joe Rogan Experience on May 5, 2021.

Endnotes 
1. , Harvard Law School

See also 

 To the Stars (organization)

References 

1957 births
American intelligence analysts
American people of Scotch-Irish descent
Colby College alumni
Living people
Mellon family
People from Topeka, Kansas
Yale University alumni